Buscate is a comune (municipality) in the Province of Milan in the Italian region Lombardy, located about  northwest of Milan.

It is the ancestral home of the Pisoni family.

Buscate borders the following municipalities: Magnago, Dairago, Castano Primo, Arconate, Inveruno, Cuggiono.

Demographic evolution

References

External links
 www.comune.buscate.mi.it/

Cities and towns in Lombardy